Coralliophila francoisi is a species of sea snail, a marine gastropod mollusk in the family Muricidae, the murex snails or rock snails.

Description
The length of the shell attains 42.3 mm.

Distribution
This marine species occurs off Madagascar..

References

Gastropods described in 2006
Coralliophila